Wagner Corrêa Machado, known as Wagner Carioca, (born March 24, 1987 in Macaé), is a Brazilian midfielder. He currently plays for Duque de Caxias.

Honours
Rio de Janeiro's Cup: 2006

Contract
Madureira 5 July 2005 to 5 July 2010

External links
Profile at Soccerway
 CBF 
 Guardian Stats Centre
Profile at futpedia 

1987 births
Living people
Brazilian footballers
Expatriate footballers in Thailand
Campeonato Brasileiro Série B players
Campeonato Brasileiro Série C players
Wagner Carioca
Madureira Esporte Clube players
Figueirense FC players
Nova Iguaçu Futebol Clube players
Associação Desportiva Cabofriense players
Macaé Esporte Futebol Clube players
Mogi Mirim Esporte Clube players
Associação Desportiva São Caetano players
Atlético Clube Goianiense players
Wagner Carioca
Association football midfielders
People from Macaé
Sportspeople from Rio de Janeiro (state)